Chow Tewa Mein is an Indian politician from the state of Arunachal Pradesh.

Chow Tewa Mein was elected unopposed from Chowkham seat in the 2014 Arunachal Pradesh Legislative Assembly election, standing as a People's Party of Arunachal candidate. In terms of educational qualification, he is a graduate (B.A.).

He was one of 6 MLAs along with Chief Minister Pema Khandu to be suspended by the PPA for anti-party activities.

See also
Arunachal Pradesh Legislative Assembly

References

External links
Chow Tewa Mein profile
MyNeta Profile
Janpratinidhi Profile 

Indian National Congress politicians
Living people
People's Party of Arunachal politicians
Arunachal Pradesh MLAs 2014–2019
Bharatiya Janata Party politicians from Arunachal Pradesh
Year of birth missing (living people)